You're in the Army Now may refer to:

You're in the Army Now, 1941 comedy film directed by Lewis Seiler
O.H.M.S. (film), 1937 British film, known as You're in the Army Now in the US
"You're in the Army Now" (song), also known as "We're in the Army Now", an American song written in 1917 by Isham Jones with lyrics written by Tell Taylor and Ole Olsen
"You're in the Army Now" (Bolland & Bolland song), 1982 song by Dutch duo Bolland & Bolland, made famous later by Status Quo as "In the Army Now"

See also
You're in the Navy Now, 1951 film directed by Henry Hathaway
In the Army Now (disambiguation)